Chainpur block (Palamu district) is one of the administrative blocks of Palamu district, Jharkhand state, India. The block contains 35 panchayats.
According to 2011 census

List of panchayats
 Rabada
 Khura Kalan
 Karso
 Bondi
 Salatua
 Buribir
 Ornar
 Bansdih
 Baraon
 Narsinghpur Pathara
 Kosiyara
 Patariya Khurd
 Purbdiha
 Lokeya
 Taleya Babhandih
 Mahugawan
 Bandua
 Jhariwa
 Shahpur (North)
 Shahpur (South)
 Chainpur
 Bhargawan
 Neura
 Semara
 Bedama Babhandih
 Nawadih
 Ramgarh
 Uldanda
 Chorhat
 Kankari
 Basariya Kalan
 Chando
 Awsane
 Bansdih Khurd
 Huttar

Schools and college 
 Greater S.L.A. School, (residential school) Birsanagar Shahpur
 Rotary (Anand Shankar)
 Gyan Sagar Public School
 St. Ignatius H/S School Kundpani
 St.Xavir Middle School Mahuwabathan
 SSGPH High School
 Climax Public School
 The Success Hub, Chainpur Block
Oxford public school, new township chainpur shahpur

See also 
 Palamu Loksabha constituency
 Jharkhand Legislative Assembly
 Jharkhand
 Palamu

References

Blocks of Palamu district

Community development blocks in Jharkhand
Community development blocks in Palamu district